Chapleau 75 is a First Nations reserve located near Chapleau, Ontario. It is one of two reserves of the Chapleau Cree First Nation.

References

Cree reserves in Ontario
Communities in Sudbury District